The Golden Key is a 2001 Vietnamese romantic war film directed by Lê Hoàng. It was well received by critics.

External links 

2001 films
Vietnamese romance films
Vietnam War films
Vietnamese-language films